The Reformed Churches in South Africa is a Christian denomination in South Africa that was formed in 1859 in Rustenburg. Members of the church are sometimes referred to as Doppers.

History of the Gereformeerde Kerke in South Africa

In the early 19th century a new hymnbook was introduced in the Dutch churches in the Netherlands, which was implemented in the Dutch Reformed Church in the Cape Colony. Many of these songs contradicted the teachings of the three confessions accepted at the Synod of Dort in 1618/1619 (The Heidelberg Catechism, the Belgic Confession and the Canons of Dort). Some of the church members could not accept these doctrines. When they refused to sing the hymns, they were threatened with excommunication. They held the view: In Gods huis Gods lied (In God's house God's songs).

The main founders of the denomination were particularly concentrated in the vicinity of Rustenburg, in the Transvaal. In 1859, 15 brothers decided to separate themselves from the Dutch Reformed Church. These 15 members held a meeting on 10 February 1859 under a seringboom at Rustenburg. At this meeting, 300 members enrolled as members of Gereformeerde Kerke. The spot is marked today by the Syringa Tree Monument.

The Gereformeerde Kerke founded a seminary for theological studies and teacher training in Burgersdorp in the Eastern Cape. It was moved to Potchefstroom in the early 20th century, where it became the Potchefstroom University College for Higher Christian Education, now the North West University. One of the faculties is the seminary for training their ministers.

The Gereformeerde Kerke today
The official name of the church body today is Die Gereformeerde Kerke in Suid-Afrika (GKSA). It is also known as the Reformed Churches in South Africa (RCSA). It has 415 Congregations ministering to people in all 11 official languages of South Africa. There are congregations in Zimbabwe, Namibia and Lesotho.

The General Synod meets every third year in Potchefstroom.

It has ecumenical ties with churches on all the continents of the world, except Antarctica.

Songbook of Gereformeerde Kerke 
The Gereformeerde Kerke today uses only hymns from the Bible: the Psalms as well as Skrifberymings. Skrifberymings are hymns based on passages from the Bible.

Besides the Psalms and Skrifberymings, the hymnal contains the following:
 Three Forms of Unity, which consist of the Belgic Confession, the Heidelberg Catechism and the Canons of Dort.
 The liturgical forms for the baptism of children, public confession of faith, the baptism of adults, the holy communion, confirmation of elders and deacons, confirmation of ministers, and the marriage ceremony.
 The Church Order
 A number of prayers.

Theology

Creeds 
Apostles Creed
Athanasian Creed
Nicene Creed

Confessions 
Canons of Dort
Belgic Confession
Heidelberg Catechism

Church government 
The Reformed Churches have a Presbyterian – Synodal system of church government. The church consists of the Eastern Regional Synod, the Bushweld Synod, the Northwest Synod, the Regional Synod of Free State and KwaZulu-Natal, the Southern Regional Synod, and the Randvaal Regional Synod.

Seminary 
The Reformed Churches in South Africa have their own Theological Seminary " Die Teologiese Skool" in Potchefstroom.

Missions 
The Reformed Churches in South Africa has a number of growing local congregations. The denomination has local outreaches in Botswana and Mozambique. There are churches that support missionaries in Burundi. The Reformed Church in Rustenburg, South Africa has agreement with Koshin Presbyterian Church in Korea to support evangelism, and establishing new multicultural churches in Rustenburg area. The church cooperates with the Presbyterian Church of Brazil in missions in Angola and Mozambique. It is also involved in a Reformed church plant in Hanoi, Vietnam. Through membership in the World Reformed Fellowship, Gereformeerde Gemeenten collabotates WRF's works, also for example in the International Institute of Islamic Studies.

Relations with other Reformed churches
Reformed Churches in South Africa is a member of the World Reformed Fellowship and the International Conference of Reformed Churches

The Gereformeerde Kerke has sister church relationship with the :
Christian Reformed Churches in the Netherlands
Reformed Churches in the Netherlands (Liberated)
Netherlands Reformed Churches
Reformed Churches in Botswana
United Reformed Church in Congo
Christian Reformed Church in North America
Orthodox Presbyterian Church
Christian Reformed Churches of Australia
Free Church of Scotland
Reformed Churches of New Zealand
Reformed Church in Japan
Presbyterian Church in Korea (Koshin).

Footnotes

References
 "Professor Dirk Postma (1818–1890)", Dr. G.C.P. van der Vyver, Pro Rege Pers, 1958
 "Handleiding vir die studie van Kerkgeskiedenis" (Guide for the Study of Church History), Prof. S. du Toit, Pro Rege Pers, 1970

External links
 Official website 
 Reformed Church in Rustenburg, South Africa
 Reformed Church in Pretoria, South Africa

Protestantism in South Africa
Reformed denominations in Africa
Members of the World Reformed Fellowship
Religious organizations established in 1859
1859 establishments in South Africa
Establishments in the South African Republic
1859 in the South African Republic
1859 establishments in Africa
Dutch-South African culture